Clifford Bruce (1885–1919) was a Canadian film actor of the silent era.

Selected filmography
 When Rome Ruled (1914)
 A Fool There Was (1915)
 Lady Audley's Secret (1915)
 A Woman's Past (1915)
 The Weakness of Strength (1916)
 The Devil at His Elbow (1916)
 Blue Jeans (1917)
 The Siren (1917)
 The Sin Woman (1917)
 The Barricade (1917)
 The Final Payment (1917)
 The Winding Trail (1918)
 Breakers Ahead (1918)
 Riders of the Night (1918)
 A Weaver of Dreams (1918)
 Black Is White (1920)

References

Bibliography
 Solomon, Aubrey. The Fox Film Corporation, 1915-1935: A History and Filmography. McFarland, 2011.

External links

1885 births
1919 deaths
Canadian male film actors
Canadian male silent film actors
Male actors from Toronto
Canadian emigrants to the United States